This is a list of members of the Maltese House of Representatives elected to the 13th legislature in the 2017 general election. They are arranged by district.

The governing party is the Labour Party backed by 1 Independent MP, while the Nationalist Party and 2 Independent MPs form the opposition.

List by office 

Partit Laburista (Labour):
Abela Carmelo, District 3
Abela Robert (Prime Minister), District 6
Agius Chris, District 2 (resigned) (replaced by Bedingfield)
Agius Decelis Anthony,
Bartolo Clayton, District 12 casual
Bartolo Evarist, District 10   District 12 resigned
Bedingfield Glenn (Government Whip), (casual election)
Bonnici Owen, District 5
Borg Ian, District 7
Camilleri Byron,
Camilleri Clint, District 4  District 13
Cardona Chris (District 8 resigned replaced by Castaldi)
Caruana Clyde,
Caruana Justyne, District 13
Castaldi Paris Ian, District 8 (casual)
Cutajar Rosianne, District 6 (casual)
Dalli Miriam,  District 2  (also elected in District 3 resigned)
Debattista Deo,  District 1
Falzon, Michael, District 9 resigned     District 10
Farrugia Aaron, District 1
Farrugia Michael, District 12
Farrugia Portelli Julia, District 5
Fearne Chris, District 3 (also elected in District 4 resigned) replaced by Greche, Etienne)
Galdes Roderick, District 6
Grech, Etienne District 4 casual 
Grima Clifton, District 9
Grixti Silvio, District 3
Herrera José, District 1
Mallia Emanuel, District 9 (casual)
Micallef Jean Claude, District 3 (casual)
Mizzi Joe, District 2 (also elected in District 4 resigned)
Mizzi, Konrad District 4
Muscat Alex, District 2 (also elected in District 5 resigned)
Parnis Silvio, District 4
Refalo Anton, District 13
Schembri Silvio, District 6 resigned
Scicluna Edward, District 7 resigned replaced by Gullia[?] District 8 resigned (replaced by Zammit-Lewis)
Zammit Lewis Edward, District 8 (casual)
Zrinzo Azzopardi Stefan. District 5 (casual)

Partit Nazzjonalista (Nationalist): 
Agius David, District 8      District 11 resigned
Aquilina Karol, District 10 casual
Arrigo Robert, District 9  (District 10 resigned)
Azzopardi Jason, District 4 District 13 supplemental resigned
Bartolo District 9 casual  District 11 casual
Bezzina Toni, District 5
Bussuttil District 11 resigned District 12 resigned
Buttigieg Claudette, District 12 
Callus Ryan, District 6
Comodini Cachia Therese, District 8
Cutajar Kevin, District 13
Cutajar Robert (Opposition Whip), District 12 
de Marco Mario, Ditrict 1
Debono Kristy, District 7 resigned District 9
Deguara Maria, District 11 casual
Delia Adrian, District 7 co-opted
Farrugia District 7 (casual) 
Farrugia, Marlene District 10
Fenech Adami Beppe, (District 7 resigned) District 8
Galea Mario, District 3
Gouder Karl, District 10
Grech Bernard (Opposition Leader),
Grech Claudio, District 1
Micallef, Peter District 7 (casual
Mifsud Bonnici Carmelo, District  4 (added as supplemental member)
Portelli, Marthese District 9 resigned District 13 resigned
Puli Clyde, District 6
Said Chris, District 13
Schiavone Hermann,  District 5
Spiteri Stephen,  District 2
Stellini District `3 casual resigned
Thake David, District 12 casual
Vassallo Edwin.  District 11 casual

Independent
Farrugia Godfrey,
Farrugia Marlene,
Mizzi Konrad.

Bibliography 
 Maltese Parliament website: Electoral districts

MPs

Lists of members of the parliament of Malta
Members of parliament